Gnanaseelan Gunaseelan is a Sri Lankan Tamil physician, politician and provincial minister.

Gunaseelan was Medical Officer of Health (MOH) for Manthai West and Madhu.

Gunaseelan contested the 2013 provincial council election as one of the Tamil National Alliance's candidates in Mannar District and was elected to the Northern Provincial Council. After the election he was appointed to assist the Minister of Health and Indigenous Medicine on food supply. He took his oath as provincial councillor in front of Chief Minister C. V. Vigneswaran at his residence in Colombo on 14 October 2013.

Sarveswaran was sworn in as Minister of Health and Indigenous Medicine and Probation and Childcare Services in front of Governor Reginald Cooray on 23 August 2017.

References

Year of birth missing (living people)
Living people
Health ministers of Sri Lankan provinces
Members of the Northern Province Board of Ministers
People from Northern Province, Sri Lanka
Sri Lankan Tamil physicians
Sri Lankan Tamil politicians
Tamil Eelam Liberation Organization politicians
Tamil National Alliance politicians